Oliver Mayer or Oliver Dench (born 9 September 1993) is an English actor and theatre maker. He is co-founding artistic director of the Revolve Theatre Company. On television, he is known for his roles in the CW series Pandora (2019–2020) and the BritBox period drama Hotel Portofino (2022–).

Early life
Dench was born in Reading. His maternal grandfather was Jeffery Dench, actor and brother of Judi Dench. He attended The Henley College. Dench has said he was "obsessed with Shakespeare as a child thanks to my granddad".

Career
In 2014, Dench formed the Henley-on-Thames-based Revolve Theatre Company with Joe Morris and Tom Smith. Their debut show at the Henley Fringe Festival was Dench in a one-man version of Hamlet playing all fifteen roles.

Dench made his television debut in 2016 as Will Palmerston in the Canadian YTV series Ride about an equestrian school in England. He made his London stage debut in School Play at Southwark Playhouse in 2017. He appeared in the 2018 Sky Kids series The Athena.

In 2019, Dench began starring in the CW science fiction series Pandora as Xander Duvall, a role he would play for both seasons. He played Iullus in the first season of Domina before the role was taken over by Joseph Ollman. As of 2022, Dench stars as Lucian Ainsworth in the period drama Hotel Portofino. He starred as Cliff in the Paris revival of Cabaret that December at Le Lido on the Champs-Élysées.

Filmography

Film

Television

Stage

References

External links
 
 Oliver Dench at Eamonn Bedford

Living people
1990s births
21st-century English male actors
Oliver
English male stage actors
Male actors from Berkshire
People from Reading, Berkshire
Theatre practitioners